United Air Lines Trip 4 was a Boeing 247D operating on a scheduled flight from Salt Lake City, Utah, to Cheyenne, Wyoming, on October 7, 1935. The aircraft last contacted Cheyenne at 02:16 or 02:17, reporting its position as Silver Crown. Cheyenne called the flight at 02:21, receiving no reply. The weather was virtually clear with ceiling unlimited. 

The wreckage was located 3 mi (4.8 km) east of Silver Crown. The aircraft struck the ground in a shallow descent just below a small knoll. Marks on the ground made by the propellers, fuselage, and engine showed the aircraft was in a normal flight attitude. Propeller marks and engine damage established the engines were developing normal power and the aircraft was at cruising speed. An untouched knoll 60 ft (18 m) further back on the flight path and 3 ft (0.9 m) higher established that the aircraft was descending. 

The pilot was believed to be flying on instruments. The probable cause was determined to be pilot error in failing to monitor altitude or location.

See also
1934 United Airlines Boeing 247 crash, another controlled flight into terrain accident that happened on the same route

External links
Bureau of Air Commerce Accident Board Report (PDF)

Airliner accidents and incidents in Wyoming
Aviation accidents and incidents in the United States in 1935
4
Disasters in Wyoming
Accidents and incidents involving the Boeing 247
Airliner accidents and incidents caused by pilot error
Laramie County, Wyoming
1935 in Wyoming